Fred Jackson (born June 9, 1950) is an American football coach and former player. He is an offensive analyst and interim running backs coach at the University of Michigan. He previously coached at Michigan from 1992 to 2014. In 2014, he was the longest tenured member of the Michigan Wolverines football coaching staff, having served on the staffs of Gary Moeller, Lloyd Carr, Rich Rodriguez, and Brady Hoke. In addition to coaching running backs, Jackson served as Michigan's offensive coordinator (1995–1996), assistant head coach (1997–2002), and associate head coach (2003–2007). He was a finalist for the Broyles Award, given annually to the nation's top college football assistant coach, in 2000. After Michigan head coach Lloyd Carr retired following the 2007 season, Jackson was the only member of the coaching staff retained by Carr's successor, Rich Rodriguez. When Rodriguez was fired after the 2010 season, Jackson was the only member of Rodriguez's staff retained by his successor, Brady Hoke. Hoke and Jackson served as assistants together under Carr and Gary Moeller for a total of eight years including the 1997 national championship season.

Before coming to Michigan, Jackson coached at the University of Toledo (1979–1981), the University of Wisconsin–Madison (1982–1986), the United States Naval Academy (1987), the University of South Carolina (1988), Purdue University (1989–1990), and Vanderbilt University (1991).

Jackson is a resident of Ann Arbor, Michigan. His son, Jeremy Jackson, was a wide receiver for the Michigan Wolverines football team from 2010 until 2013 and his younger son, Josh Jackson, was the starting quarterback for the Maryland Terrapins.

References

1950 births
Living people
American football quarterbacks
Jackson State Tigers football players
Michigan Wolverines football coaches
Navy Midshipmen football coaches
Purdue Boilermakers football coaches
South Carolina Gamecocks football coaches
Toledo Rockets football coaches
Vanderbilt Commodores football coaches
Wisconsin Badgers football coaches
High school football coaches in Michigan
University of Michigan alumni
Players of American football from Baton Rouge, Louisiana
African-American coaches of American football
African-American players of American football